António João Pereira de Albuquerque Tavares da Silva (born 30 October 2003) is a Portuguese professional footballer who plays as a centre-back for Primeira Liga club Benfica and the Portugal national team.

Coming through Benfica's youth system, Silva impressed during his time with the reserve side, winning the UEFA Youth League in 2021–22, being instrumental part of Benfica's first European trophy in 60 years. He was subsequently promoted to the first-team, making his professional debut at age 17 in a breakthrough 2022–23 season.

Silva is a former Portugal youth international, representing his country at various levels. He was chosen in the senior squad for the 2022 FIFA World Cup, making shortly after, his senior international debut.

Club career

Benfica

Early career
Born in Viseu, Silva began his youth career with hometown club Viseu United, aged 11, and also had spells at Penalva do Castelo and Repesenses. He quickly stood out, subsequently began having multiple training sessions with Sporting CP, while Porto also showed an interest in signing him, but he ended up joining their rivals and his boyhood club Benfica's youth academy in 2016. Struggling with homesickness, Silva returned to his hometown to spend time with his family, but with the help of the club's psychologist, he managed to overcome his mental health problems and went back to Benfica a year later, after adjusting to life in Lisbon.

2021–23: Youth League win and first-team breakthrough
On 28 November 2021, Silva signed his first professional contract with Benfica B. He made his professional debut with Benfica B in a 2–1 LigaPro loss to Mafra on 2 April 2022. During that season, Silva played a major role in the 2021–22 UEFA Youth League, where Benfica U19 topped their group against Dynamo Kyiv, Barcelona and Bayern Munich. In the final phases, he scored the equaliser in a 3–2 win over Midtjylland, after his side were two goals behind and in the final, he helped his side keep a clean sheet in a 6–0 win over Red Bull Salzburg to help Benfica win their first Youth League title, and their first title in European football since the 1961–62 European Cup.

Having appeared for the club's B team, it was expected that Silva would spend the 2022–23 season continuing his development there, but he began training with the first team, after impressing newly arrived coach Roger Schmidt, which led him to progress in the team's centre-backs ranks, ahead of Tomás Araujo and Jan Vertonghen, who was away on international duty for Belgium. Following the suspension of Nicolás Otamendi, he was given his first start by the new coach on 27 August, being entrusted in the centre defence, alongside Morato, and putting a strong performance, in a 3–0 away win over Boavista in the Primeira Liga. He subsequently became a starter following an injury crisis at the club, leading Silva to fill the void alongside Otamendi, who was the only fit centre-back available. On 5 September, he agreed to a contract extension to 2027, increasing his buyout clause to €100 million. The following day, Silva made his UEFA Champions League debut, partnering with Nicolás Otamendi in the centre of defence, keeping a clean sheet in a 2–0 home win over Maccabi Haifa. 

Silva was named the league's Defender of the Month for September, after helping Benfica maintaining their unbeaten run, which included three clean sheets. On 25 October, Silva scored his first goal for the club, opening Benfica's 4–3 home victory over Juventus in a 2022–23 UEFA Champions League group stage match. His form throughout the club's Champions League group stage campaign, saw him help his side qualify to the round of sixteen, as group winners, following a 6–1 away win over Maccabi Haifa on 2 November. Four days later, Silva scored his first league goals, netting a brace in a 5–1 victory against Estoril. This saw him being the league's Defender of the Month for the months of October and November.

International career
Silva represented Portugal at under-16, under-17, under-18 and under-19, for a total of 18 caps, serving as captain for the latter. On 24 September 2022, Silva made his under-21 debut, replacing André Amaro in a 4–1 friendly defeat of Georgia.

In October 2022, he was named in Portugal's preliminary 55-man squad for the 2022 FIFA World Cup in Qatar, being included in the final 26-man squad for the tournament. He made his senior international debut in a friendly against Nigeria on 17 November, starting in Portugal's 4–0 win. With Portugal having secured qualification from their group, he started in the last fixture, featuring in the 2–1 loss to South Korea in Al Rayyan. In doing so, he became the youngest player ever to represent Portugal at the World Cup at 19 years, one months and three days old.

Style of play
A hard-tackling and versatile defender, Silva is a physically strong, right-footed centre-back, who usually features on the right-hand side of central defence, but he is able to play on both sides due to being comfortable at passing the ball with both feet. He is able to pass in different directions, whether to a teammate on the same side as him, or switching it to the opposing side or making vertical line-breaking passes, in order to dictate play in any direction from the back. He is known for being an accurate tackler, who is very good at winning back possession, and at anticipating and intercepting plays, due to his acute tactical intelligence, speed of thought, marking ability, positional sense and his ability to read the game. In addition to his defensive skills, he is comfortable on the ball, possessing good technical ability, as well as good distribution. He is also known for his ability to cover ground and put pressure on or anticipate opponents in positions higher up on the pitch. 

He is also known for his leadership skills, with former Portuguese international Abel Xavier commenting that for his "security, maturity, vision of the game, assertiveness, aggression, and for his leadership and not for his age, he can be the future captain of Benfica". Silva idolises compratriot Cristiano Ronaldo and Benfica legend Luisão and also cited compratriot Rúben Dias, Antonio Rüdiger and Virgil van Dijk as inspirations.

Career statistics

Club

International

Honours
Benfica Youth
Campeonato Nacional de Juniores: 2021–22
 UEFA Youth League: 2021–22
Individual
 Cosme Damião Awards – Revelation of the Year: 2022
Primeira Liga Defender of the Month: September 2022, October/November 2022

References

External links

 Profile at the S.L. Benfica website

2003 births
Living people
People from Viseu
Portuguese footballers
Portugal youth international footballers
Portugal international footballers
Association football defenders
Liga Portugal 2 players
Primeira Liga players
S.L. Benfica footballers
S.L. Benfica B players
Sportspeople from Viseu District
2022 FIFA World Cup players